Nuclear RNA export factor 1, also known as NXF1 or TAP, is a protein which in humans is encoded by the NXF1 gene.

Function 
This gene is one member of a family of nuclear RNA export factor genes. Common domain features of this family are a noncanonical RNP-type RNA-binding domain (RBD), 4 leucine-rich repeats (LRRs), a nuclear transport factor 2 (NTF2)-like domain that allows heterodimerization with NTF2-related export protein-1 (NXT1), and a ubiquitin-associated domain that mediates interactions with nucleoporins. Alternative splicing results in transcript variants. The LRRs and NTF2-like domains are required for export activity. The encoded protein of this gene shuttles between the nucleus and the cytoplasm and binds in vivo to poly(A)+ RNA. It is the vertebrate homologue of the yeast protein Mex67p. The encoded protein overcomes the mRNA export block caused by the presence of saturating amounts of CTE (constitutive transport element) RNA of type D retroviruses.  A variant allele of the homologous Nxf1 gene in mice suppresses a class of mutations caused by integration of an endogenous retrovirus (intracisternal A particle) into an intron.

Interactions 

NXF1 has been shown to interact with TNPO2, MAGOH, U2 small nuclear RNA auxiliary factor 1, DHX9, HuD and NUP214.

Tap protein
In molecular biology, another name for the protein NXF1 is TAP. In particular this entry focuses on the C-terminal domain, which also contains the UBA (protein domain).

This entry contains the NXF family of shuttling transport receptors for nuclear export of mRNA, which include:

vertebrate mRNA export factor TAP or nuclear RNA export factor 1 (NXF1).
 Caenorhabditis elegans nuclear RNA export factor 1 (nxf-1).
yeast mRNA export factor MEX67. Members of the NXF family have a modular structure. A nuclear localization sequence and a noncanonical RNA recognition motif (RRM) (see PROSITEDOC) followed by four LRR repeats are located in its N-terminal half. The C-terminal half contains a NTF2 domain (see [href="http://expasy.org/prosite/PDOC50177 PROSITEDOC]) followed by a second domain, TAP-C. The TAP-C domain is important for binding to FG repeat-containing nuclear pore proteins (FG-nucleoporins) and is sufficient to mediate nuclear shuttling.

The Tap-C domain is made of four alpha helices packed against each other. The arrangement of helices 1, 2 and 3 is similar to that seen in a UBA fold. and is joined to the next module by flexible 12-residue Pro-rich linker.

Function 
Nuclear export of mRNAs is mediated by the Tap protein.

Structure 
Tap can form a multimeric complex with itself and with other members of the NXF family. Three functional domains of Tap have been well characterized: the RNA-binding domain, the Nuclear Transport Factor 2 (NTF2)-like domain, and the ubiquitin-associated (UBA) domain.

References

External links 
 PDBe-KB provides an overview of all the structure information available in the PDB for Human Nuclear RNA export factor 1 (NXF1)